Poppea's Hot Nights is a 1969 Italian comedy film set in Ancient Rome. It was written and directed  by Guido Malatesta and stars Olga Schoberová (credited as Olinka Berova) and Brad Harris in the main roles.

Plot

Cast

 Olinka Berova as Poppaea Sabina 
 Brad Harris as Claudius Valerius
 Gia Sandri as Lucretia
 Howard Ross as Marco 
 Femi Benussi as Livia 
 Sandro Dori as Nero 
 Daniele Vargas as Druso 
 Carla Calò as Calpurnia 
 Nello Pazzafini as Father Colonnius
 Tullio Altamura as Seneca the Younger
 Silvio Bagolini as Maestro Lepido
 Elisa Mainardi as Dionisia
 Ignazio Balsamo as Tarquinio
 Demeter Bitenc as Tigellino 
 Franco Pasquetto as Leander
 Fortunato Arena as the Legionary
 Marco Tulli as the Priest
 Alberto Sorrentino as the Roman waiting for Drusilla

References

External links

Italian historical comedy films
1969 comedy films
1969 films
Films directed by Guido Malatesta
Films set in ancient Rome
Films set in the Roman Empire
Depictions of Nero on film
Cultural depictions of Poppaea Sabina
Cultural depictions of Seneca the Younger
1960s Italian-language films
1960s Italian films